Melaleuca incana subsp. incana, commonly known as grey honey-myrtle, is a plant in the myrtle family Myrtaceae which is endemic to the south-west of Western Australia and is naturalised in the south of Victoria in Australia. It is commonly grown as a garden plant and produces large numbers of white or creamy yellow flowers in early spring.

Description 
Melaleuca incana subsp. incana is a medium to tall shrub with weeping branches. The leaves and young branches are covered with fine, soft hairs giving the foliage a grey appearance.

The flowers are arranged in spikes, usually on the ends of branches which continue to grow after flowering. The stamens are arranged in five bundles around the flower, each bundle containing between 3 and 11 stamens.

Taxonomy and naming
This species was first described in 1819 by Robert Brown in Edward's Botanical Register. Edwards called the plant "Grizzly Melaleuca" and noted that the plant was ...first observed by Mr. Brown, in King George the Third's Sound, on the south-west coast of New Holland. ... We were favoured with the specimen, for the drawing, by Lady Aylesford ... We are indebted to Mr. Brown for the specific characters, and all we know concerning the plant. The specific epithet (incana) "is from the Latin incanus, hoary, white, in reference to the colour of the leaves".

Distribution and habitat
Melaleuca incana subsp. incana occurs between Albany and Jurien Bay and inland as far as the Dryandra woodland in the Avon Wheatbelt, Geraldton Sandplains, Jarrah Forest, Swan Coastal Plain and Warren biogeographic region. It is also naturalised in the Gippsland and Otway plains areas of Victoria.

Uses

Horticulture
Melaleuca incana subspecies incana is widely cultivated. It is a hardy plant, fast growing, tolerating a range of soils and conditions after initial establishment and is frost hardy. It is widely available in commercial nurseries and tolerates pruning to form a hedge. It is susceptible to scale insect attack.

References

External links

incana subsp. incana
Myrtales of Australia
Rosids of Western Australia
Plants described in 1819
Plant subspecies